The subclavius is a small triangular muscle, placed between the clavicle and the first rib. Along with the pectoralis major and pectoralis minor muscles, the subclavius muscle makes up the anterior axioappendicular muscles, also known as anterior wall of the axilla.

Structure
It arises by a short, thick tendon from the first rib and its cartilage at their junction, in front of the costoclavicular ligament.

The fleshy fibers proceed obliquely superolaterally, to be inserted into the groove on the under surface of the clavicle.

Innervation
The nerve to subclavius (or subclavian nerve) innervates the muscle. This arises from the junction of the fifth and sixth cervical nerves, from the superior/upper trunk of the brachial plexus.

Variation
Insertion into coracoid process instead of clavicle or into both clavicle and coracoid process. Sternoscapular fasciculus to the upper border of scapula. Sternoclavicularis from manubrium to clavicle between pectoralis major and coracoclavicular fascia. Rarely, the subclavius may be missing entirely.

Function
It depresses the lateral clavicle, acts to stabilize the clavicle while the shoulder moves the arm. It also raises the first rib while lowering the clavicle during breathing.

The subclavius protects the underlying brachial plexus and subclavian vessels from a broken clavicle - the most frequently broken long bone.

Additional images

References

External links

 PTCentral
 Pivotal Places: help for problem shoulders

Muscles of the upper limb